Ch'api Ch'apini (Aymara ch'api thorn, the reduplication indicates that there is a complex of something, -ni a suffix, "the one with many thorns, also spelled Chapi Chapini) is a mountain in the La Paz Department in the Andes of Bolivia  which reaches a height of approximately . It is located in the Loayza Province, Malla Municipality. Ch'api Ch'apini lies southwest of Wari Jarisiña.

References 

Mountains of La Paz Department (Bolivia)